Pak Meng Beach is a sand beach in Tambon Mai Fat, Amphoe Sikao, Trang Province, southern Thailand. It is known as Trang's most popular beach.

When the tide is at its lowest, there is a  sand strip where it is possible to drive a car. This is a result of the wet sand having sufficient density to support the car's weight.

The name of the beach comes from a folklore story about an old man named "Old Meng" (เฒ่าเมง) who was going to have a wedding ceremony for his daughter. But he and his all members of family died from a storm in the sea and his body became a mountain called Khao Meng (เขาเมง), which stands near the beach.

Pak Meng Beach, especially at sunset, is renowned for the scenery.

Pak Meng Beach also has pier, where visitors can rent boats to other nearby marine attractions such as Ko Ngai, Ko Kradan, Ko Ma, Ko Chuek, Ko Waen, Ko Muk and Emerald Cave.

In addition, around Pak Meng Beach are many restaurants, and the road from here to Chang Lang Beach also known as Chao Mai Beach, there are two bridges crossing the estuary of Andaman Sea, which is commonly used as a place for fishing.

References

Beaches of Thailand
Tourist attractions in Trang province